Jayvee Tyron Lim Uy (born May 8, 1985) is a Filipino politician who currently serves as a Governor of Davao de Oro since 2016. Uy was only 31 years old when he was first elected governor of Davao de Oro, then named as Compostela Valley, in 2016 and was re-elected in 2019.  He is also known as the youngest governor of Mindanao.

References

External links
davaodeoro.gov.ph Province of Davao de Oro]

Living people
1985 births
People from Davao de Oro
Governors of Davao de Oro
Hugpong ng Pagbabago politicians